Forbidden Priests (Prêtres interdits) is a French film directed by Denys de La Patellière in 1973 starring Robert Hossein and Claude Jade.

Synopsis
This French melodrama tells the tragic story of a rare couple: Priest Jean (Robert Hossein), who falls in love with a young woman, the 17-year-old girl Françoise (Claude Jade was 25 during the shooting), has relations with her, and gets her pregnant. That happens during World War II. Some years later Françoise waits for her majority to get her child out from the orphanage and Jean becomes a communist.

Cast 
 Robert Hossein - Jean Rastaud
 Claude Jade - Françoise Bernardeau
 Claude Piéplu - Father Grégoire Ancely
 Pierre Mondy - Paul Lacoussade
 Louis Seigner - Bishop
 Germaine Delbat - Jean's mother
 Michèle Watrin - Françoise's cousin
 Lucienne Legrand - Françoise's mother
 Georges Audoubert - Françoise's father

External links
 
 
 Prêtres interdits at notre Cinema

1973 films
1970s French-language films
1973 drama films
Films directed by Denys de La Patellière
French drama films
1970s French films